Bulinus hightoni is a species of freshwater snail, an aquatic gastropod mollusk in the family Planorbidae, the ram's horn snails.

Distribution
This species is endemic to Kenya, Africa.

Habitat
This snail lives in rivers, intermittent rivers, and shrub-dominated wetlands. The survival of hits species is threatened by habitat loss.

References

Bulinus
Endemic molluscs of Kenya
Gastropods described in 1978
Taxonomy articles created by Polbot